Volhynian Governorate or Volyn Governorate was an administrative-territorial unit initially of the Russian Empire, created at the end of 1796 after the Third Partition of Poland from the territory of the short-lived Volhynian Vice-royalty and Wołyń Voivodeship.

After the Peace of Riga, part of the governorate became the new Wołyń Voivodeship in the Second Polish Republic, while the other part stayed as a part of the Ukrainian SSR until 1925 when it was abolished on resolution of the All-Ukrainian Central Executive Committee and Counsel of People's Commissars.

History

Until 1796 the guberniya was administrated as a namestnichestvo (Vice-royalty). It was initially centred in Iziaslav and was called the Izyaslav namesnichestvo. It was created mostly out of the Kiev Voivodeship and the east part of the Wolyn Voivodeship.

On 24 October 1795 the Third Partition of Poland was imposed by Prussia, the Habsburg monarchy, and the Russian Empire.

On 12 December 1796 the Volhynian Governorate (guberniya) was created and included the rest of the Wolyn Voivodeship and Kowel Voivodeship.

In 1796 the administration moved to Novograd-Volynsky, but because no buildings were found suited for administrative purposes the seat (capital) was moved again to Zhytomyr.

In 1802 Zhytomyr was finally bought out of the properties of Prince (knyaz) Ilyinsky and in 1804 it became officially the seat of the Volyn Governorate.

From 1832 to 1915 the Volhynian Governorate and the Kiev Governorate and the Podolia Governorate were part of the Southwestern Krai General-Governorate, a type of militarized administrative-territorial unit.

In the 1880s the general-governorate was extended and included also other governorates.

In 1897 the population of the gubernia was 2,989,482 and in 1905 – 3,920,400. The majority of the population of the governorate spoke in old Ukrainian language with slight variety of dialects.

During the Ukrainian–Soviet War Zhytomir served as the provisional capital of Ukraine in 1918.

After the Polish-Soviet war in 1920 and according to the Peace of Riga (1921) most of the territory became part of the Second Polish Republic and transformed into Wołyń Voivodeship with the capital in Łuck (Lutsk). The eastern portion existed to 1925 and later split into three okruhas Shepetivka Okruha, Zhytomyr Okruha, and Korosten Okruha.

Heads of Guberniya
Revkom
1919 Mikhail Kruchinskiy (concurrently the head of Volyn Cheka)

Volyn Executive Committee
1920 Oleksandr Shumsky
1920 Vasiliy Averin
 – 1921 Danylevych
1921–1922 Ivan Nikolayenko

Head of Security Services
Cheka
1919 Vasyl Viliavko
1919 M.Shuf
1919 Mikhail Kruchinskiy
November 1919 – December 1919 Vsevolod Balytsky
December 1919 Vasyl Levotsky (acting)
 – 2 November 1921 Semen Kesselman (Zapadny)
January 1922 – 2 June 1922 Janis Biksons

GPU
 -1923 Pavel Ivonin
 March 1923 – October 1923 Foma Leoniuk
 1 July 1923 – 1 September 1924 Symon Dukelsky
 1924 – 1925 Aleksandr Safes (Grozny)

Principal cities
Russian Census of 1897

 Zhytomir – 65 895 (Jewish – 30 572, Russian – 16 944, Ukrainian – 9 152)
 Rovno – 24 573 (Jewish – 13 704, Russian – 4 278, Ukrainian – 4 071)
 Kremenets – 17 704 (Ukrainian – 8 322, Jewish – 6 476, Russian – 1 863)
 Kovel – 17 697 (Jewish – 8 502, Russian – 4 828, Ukrainian – 2 093)
 Novograd-Volynsky – 16 904 (Jewish – 9 363, Russian – 2 939, Ukrainian – 2 662)
 Starokonstantinov – 16 377 (Jewish – 9 164, Ukrainian – 4 886, Russian – 1 402)
 Lutsk – 15 804 (Jewish – 9 396, Russian – 2 830, Ukrainian – 1 478)
 Ostrog – 14 749 (Jewish – 9 185, Ukrainian – 2 446, Russian – 2 199)
 Dubno – 14 257 (Jewish – 7 096, Russian – 2 962, Ukrainian – 2 474)
 Zaslavl – 12 611 (Jewish – 5 991, Ukrainian – 3 990, Russian – 1 722)

Administrative division

Language

By the Imperial census of 1897. In bold are languages spoken by more people than the state language.

Religion
By the Imperial census of 1897. In bold are religions with more members than the Eastern Orthodox.

References

 
Governorates of the Russian Empire
History of Volhynia
1790s establishments in the Russian Empire
Governorates of Ukraine